Mary Eleanor Jessie Knox née Shepard (25 December 1909 – 4 September 2000) was an English illustrator of children's books. She is best known for the Mary Poppins stories written by P. L. Travers (1934 to 1988). She used her married name Mary Knox outside the publishing industry.

Life and career

She was the daughter of E. H. Shepard, a famous illustrator of children's literature including Winnie-the-Pooh by A. A. Milne in the 1920s and a 1931 edition of The Wind in the Willows by Kenneth Grahame. She was the illustrator for the U.S. publisher Lippincot's 1937 edition of Pigeon Post by Arthur Ransome.

Shepard graduated from the Slade School of Art. She was 23 when her father was too busy to illustrate Mary Poppins and Travers discovered her work on a Christmas card.

She married E. V. Knox, 28 years her senior, in 1937. He was editor of Punch and father of the writer Penelope Fitzgerald.

References

External links

 
  (primarily under 'Shepard, Mary, 1909–' without '2000', previous page of browse report)

1909 births
2000 deaths
British children's book illustrators
English illustrators
Alumni of the Slade School of Fine Art